WYTX-LP is an Adult Album Alternative formatted broadcast radio station licensed to and serving Rock Hill, South Carolina.  WYTX-LP is owned and operated by York Technical College.

References

External links
 98-5 YTX Online
 

2015 establishments in South Carolina
Variety radio stations in the United States
Radio stations established in 2015
YTX-LP
YTX-LP